The  is a double-action revolver chambered in .38 Special based upon Smith & Wesson-style designs.

It was designed and produced by Shin-Chuō Industries, later merged with Minebea. "New Nambu" was named after Kijirō Nambu, a notable firearm designer and the founder of Shin-Chuō Industries. Approximately 133,400 have been produced since 1961. Production ceased in the 1990s, but it is still one of the standard firearms carried by law enforcement officers in Japan.

History
In the pre-war era, most Japanese law enforcement officials had only a sabre. During the Occupation, the Supreme Commander for the Allied Powers suggested that they be equipped with firearms. Because of the insufficient stocks of the domestic handguns, Japanese police started to receive service firearms leased from the Allies from 1949, and by 1951, all officers were issued handguns.

At the beginning, types of sidearm varied, but M1911 pistols and M1917 revolvers, Smith & Wesson Military & Police and Colt Official Police were used as the main sidearm. The .38 caliber revolvers were well-received, but .45 caliber handguns were too large to carry for somewhat smaller officers especially women. M1917 revolvers were beginning to be seen as obsolete and deteriorated significantly, so malfunctions or reduced accuracy had been a problem. But there were many handguns to be replaced, and with the policy of protecting industrial growth, the Ministry of International Trade and Industry (MITI) had been oriented to domestic production of service firearms.

In 1957, the development was started by Shin-Chuō Industries under the leadership of the MITI to promote domestic firearms production. The development of three handguns had been promoted at the same time in parallel: .32 ACP caliber semi-automatic pistols, 9×19mm Parabellum caliber semi-automatic pistols, and .38 Special caliber revolvers. Semi-automatic pistols were completed as New Nambu M57, but both of them did not enter into mass production. On the other hand, the revolver, completed as New Nambu M60, was satisfactory for the National Police Agency, and mass production was started in 1960.

Production was completed in 1999. Deployment of small semi-automatic pistols was considered afterward, but this plan was abandoned after small numbers of SIG Sauer P230 were deployed. Finally, imports from the United States was resumed. The Smith & Wesson Model 37 and a variant of Model 360 revolvers (SAKURA M360J) have been purchased for uniformed officers.

Design 
Basic design was based on those of the "J-Frame" and "K-Frame" revolvers of Smith & Wesson company. The revolver has a five-round cylinder, but does not fit a "J-Frame" speedloader because the actual cylinder is slightly larger. The weapon's barrel has 5 grooves, with a right hand twist and 1 turn in 15 inches. Barrel lengths vary from 2 to 3 inches.

The trigger mechanism is double-action/single-action.

Variants
The M60 was manufactured with either two or three inch barrels as described above.

A sport-use intended variant equipped with weighted longer barrel, adjustable rear sight, and adjustable competition grip called the New Nambu M60 Sakura was considered for production, but the product never went past its prototype phase.  Only three prototypes were exported for Europe.

References

Bibliography

Articles

Books 
 
 
 

Revolvers of Japan
Police weapons
Weapons and ammunition introduced in 1960